Talian may refer to:

Talian dialect, a dialect spoken in Brazil
Talian, Iran, a village in Tehran province, Iran

People with the surname
Jozef Talian (born 1985), Slovak footballer